The Gentlemen of Aspen Rugby Football Club is a rugby union team based in Aspen, Colorado.  Gentlemen of Aspen RFC was a founding member of the Super League,a national competition that ran from 1997 to 2012.  They withdrew from the SuperLeague in the middle of the 2005 season and forfeited the competition.  They now compete in the Colorado Rocky Mountain League and host the Aspen Ruggerfest tournament on the third week of September every year.

Mountain League
The Gents are the current Mountain League Champions and hold the Ski town trophy along with the Cowpie Champions trophy too for 2017.

Notable players
Carlin Isles, Wing, United States 7s, Glasgow Warriors

Alec Parker, lock

Ben Mitchell, lock

References

External links
Official Site
USA Rugby

Rugby union teams in Colorado
Rugby clubs established in 1968